Mahrik (also Romanized as Mahrīk) is a village in Naghan Rural District, Naghan District, Kiar County, Chaharmahal and Bakhtiari Province, Iran. At the 2006 census, its population was 23, in 5 families. The village is populated by Lurs.

References 

Populated places in Kiar County
Luri settlements in Chaharmahal and Bakhtiari Province